Roman Konchikov (born 23 July 1987 in Moscow) is a former Russian professional darts player. Who played in Professional Darts Corporation tournaments.

Konchikov qualified for the 2010 PDC World Darts Championship, and lost 4-3 in the preliminary round to Finland's Jarkko Komula.

He represented Russia in the inaugural PDC World Cup of Darts in 2010, partnering Anastasia Dobromyslova. The pair defeated Gibraltar's Dylan Duo and Dyson Parody in the first round before losing 6-2 to Scotland's Gary Anderson and Robert Thornton in the second round.

World Championship Results

PDC
 2010: Last 72: (lost to Jarkko Komula 3–4) (legs)

References

External links

Living people
1987 births
Russian darts players
British Darts Organisation players
Professional Darts Corporation associate players
PDC World Cup of Darts Russian team